Jean-Pierre Brulois (born 18 April 1957) is a former world champion powerlifter, strongman and Olympic Weightlifter from France

Strength sports
Jean-Pierre is best known for winning the 1990 IPF World Powerlifting Champion title in The Hague, Netherlands. A former Junior record holder in Olympic weightlifting, he also competed in four World Strongest Man contests: 1985, 1986, 1988, and 1992, finishing 8th in 1985, 5th in 1986, and 7th in 1988.

Overall, Jean-Pierre Brulois is arguably the strongest Frenchman whose feats have ever been officially verified (along with Louis Uni and Charles Rigoulot).

Personal life
In a 2005 article, Jean-Pierre Brulois explained to French strength sports specialist Emmanuel Legeard that, as a young boy, he was haunted by a recurring nightmare in which he was being crushed by a truck; weight training had helped him overcome this complex. Jean-Pierre started Olympic lifting at age 14. As a cadet (16 year old), and then again as a junior weightlifter (17 year old), he broke the French records in both the snatch and the clean and jerk, but was then called to fulfill the military service required at the time of all 18-year-old French males.

On his return from the military, he was contacted by Serge Nubret who persuaded him to leave Olympic Weightlifting for Powerlifting. In the mid-1980s, Jean-Pierre met with Marc Vouillot, a renowned Powerlifting coach, who instantly understood his athletic potential and started training him. In 1990, he was crowned super heavyweight World champion of the International Powerlifting Federation. He retired soon after for professional, as well as familial reasons. In 1990, Harry Kümel proposed him for the role of Hercules in Michel Boisrond's "Hercule aux pieds d'Omphale" ("Hercules at the Feet of Omphale").

Powerlifting Records 
Squat - 402,5 kg "raw" (IPF World Championships of 1990, cat. +125 kg)
Bench Press - 250 kg "raw" (Coupe des Flandres, 1991, cat. +125)
Deadlift - 340 kg "raw" (National championships, Federation Française de Force, cat. 125 kg)
Powerlifting Total - 972,5 kg

Notable Records in Olympic Weightlifting 
Snatch - 120 kg (French national Cadet record at age 16)
Clean and Jerk - 150 kg (French national Cadet record at age 16)

Personal Records 
Snatch - 150 kg
Clean and Jerk - 180 kg

World's Strongest Man results 
1985 World's Strongest Man - 8th
1986 World's Strongest Man - 5th
1988 World's Strongest Man - 7th

Filmography

 Hercule aux pieds d'Omphale as Hercules (1990)
 La Totale! as a villain (1991)

References

External links
 

1957 births
Living people
French male weightlifters
French strength athletes